Six by Three (also known as 6x3) is a studio album by Australian recording jazz trio Paul Grabowsky Trio; although the front cover lists the artists' surname. The album is the first for the trio of Paul Grabowsky (piano), Gary Costello (bass) and Allan Browne (drums).

At the ARIA Music Awards of 1990, the album won ARIA Award for Best Jazz Album.

Track listing

Release history

References

1989 albums
ARIA Award-winning albums
Paul Grabowsky Trio albums
Jazz albums by Australian artists